Yuma Catholic High School (YCHS) in Yuma, Arizona, United States, is a private Catholic high school that provides a college preparatory education. It is located in the Roman Catholic Diocese of Tucson.

References

Catholic High School
Catholic secondary schools in Arizona
Catholic Church in Arizona
Educational institutions established in 2000
Schools in Yuma County, Arizona
2000 establishments in Arizona